Promises to Keep may refer to:

 Promises to Keep (film), a 1988 documentary film
 Promises to Keep (novel), a 1993 novel in the Den of Shadows series
 Promises to Keep (Biden book), a 2007 memoir by Joe Biden